The São Nicolau Island Cup (Portuguese: Taça da Ilha de São Nicolau, Capeverdean Crioulo,  ALUPEC or ALUPEK: Tasa da Dja de San Nikolau) is a cup competition played during the season in the island of São Nicolau, Cape Verde, it consists of all the clubs from all the two regional divisions and are divided into about four rounds.  The competition is organized by the São Nicolau Regional Football Association (Associação Regional de Futebol de São Nicolau, ARFSN). The cup winner competes in the regional super cup final in the following season, when a cup winner also wins the championship, a runner-up competes, it was done for the first and only time in 2017, before, it was the only regional cup where no cup runner up qualified.  For several seasons, the winner qualified into Cape Verdean Cup which has been cancelled due to financial and scheduling reasons.

Its recent cup winner is Ultramarina Tarrafal who won their fourth title and their second straight.

About the cup and title history
FC Belo Horizonte and now Ultramarina Tarrafal has won the most number of cup titles numbering three, the least are Desportivo Ribeira Brava and Talho who have a title each.

Ribeira Brava Municipality has the most number of cup titles won numbering seven, of which three were won by Juncalinho and Ribeira Brava and one from Talho while Tarrafal de São Nicolau has four cup titles.

Only Caleijão (a club no longer exist today) and Académica da Preguiça are the only clubs who never won a cup title.

Winners

Performance By Club

Performance by Municipality

See also
São Nicolau Island League
São Nicolau Super Cup
São Nicolau Opening Tournament

References

External links
São Nicolau Regional Football Association which includes the São Nicolau Cup 

Sport in São Nicolau, Cape Verde
Football cup competitions in Cape Verde
2005 establishments in Cape Verde
Recurring sporting events established in 2006